Joe Slade White (March 8, 1950 - May 5, 2021) was a Democratic political strategist and media consultant.  On April 4, 2014 White was named "National Democratic Strategist of the Year" by the American Association of Political Consultants.  White's past clients have included presidential candidates, U.S. Senators, governors, members of Congress, and mayors, as well as statewide and local initiatives throughout the country. In 2013, The New York Times described White as then-Vice President Joe Biden's "long-time strategist."

Career
At the age of 21, White was hired by the 1972 presidential campaign of U.S. Senator George McGovern, joining the campaign's traveling staff and finding a place on President Richard Nixon's "White House Enemies List." White worked briefly as a press secretary to McGovern.

When he was 23, White launched his own political consulting firm and was mentored by famed admaker Tony Schwartz.   White worked to elect the first Native American to the United States Senate, the first woman Attorney General and Governor of Michigan, and worked on the first campaign in the nation to defeat a ban on bilingual education for Hispanic children.  He has also served as an advisor and created television advertisements for Vice President Joe Biden, T. Boone Pickens, Michigan Governor Jennifer Granholm, General Wesley Clark, U.S. Senator Ben Nighthorse Campbell, Speaker of the House Tip O'Neill, AT&T and others. A number of his television campaigns have won national recognition. The American Association of Political Consultants has recognized White's television work with more "Pollie Awards" than they have bestowed on any of his Democratic peers.  The 1989 book 30-Second Politics states that White produced the "first truly wordless ad" for a successful gubernatorial campaign in Oregon.

In 2010, White served as media strategist for Illinois Governor Pat Quinn’s campaign, which was named by RealClearPolitics.com as the #5 upset in the country.  I  In 2012, White helped elect the only Democratic female governor in the country, New Hampshire Governor Maggie Hassan.

Personal life and education

White was born and raised in Carroll, Iowa.  He resided in East Aurora, New York.  He had five children.  He was a graduate of Georgetown University in Washington D.C.

References

External links

 Roll Call Magazine 2011 Profile on Joe Slade White, "Joseph Biden Consultant Makes Ads Memorable"
 Joe Slade White & Company Official Website
 Joe Slade White Ads on YouTube 
 Joe Slade White Ads on Facebook 
 Joe Slade White's 8 principles of Winning Campaigns
 Newsburst Media Buying method Time buy method invented by Joe Slade White

1950 births
Living people
People from Carroll, Iowa
People from East Aurora, New York
Georgetown University alumni